Flávia Alessandra Martins da Costa (born 7 June 1974) is a Brazilian actress, best known for roles in both telenovelas, television series and films.

Biography 
Flávia Alessandra is daughter of a teacher, Raquel, and of a navy commander, Hélio. She is the youngest child of her three brothers, next to Keila and Hélio. She was born in Arraial do Cabo, state of Rio de Janeiro. She has two daughters: Giulia Martins, of the marriage with Marcos Paulo, who they divorced in 2002 and Olívia Costa, daughter to Otaviano Costa, who they married in 2006.

She also has acquired Portuguese citizenship thanks to her Portuguese paternal grandfather, who was from Ponte de Lima.

Career 
She debuted in the television with the telenovela Top Model (1989), and in the competition of the Domingão do Faustão staying in the first place, and leaving Adriana Esteves and Gabriela Duarte, in the second and third places, respectively. In the end, the three participated in the novela.
In 2001 she had her first protagonist role scheduled for the 9pm timeslot as Lívia Proença de Assunção in Porto dos Milagres, a telenovela created by Aguinaldo Silva and Ricardo Linhares. In 2002 she portrayed her Lívia again, the protagonist of the O Beijo do Vampiro. In the year 2005 she played the antagonist Cristina in Alma Gêmea. The telenovela was well highlighted as it is one of Brazilian telenovelas to possess a great audience.
In 2006 to 2007 she played Vanessa in Pé na Jaca. The show gained so much success that it even launched cloth line and other accessories for the feminine population. In 2007, she played Alzira in Aguinaldo Silva's Duas Caras.
In 2009, she played protagonist in Caras & Bocas together with Malvino Salvador.
In 2011, she returned to the small screen in Morde & Assopra portraying to roles: Naomi (a human) and Naomi (a robot). In 2012, she starred in the primetime telenovela Salve Jorge playing Érika.
In 2014, she portrayed Heloísa, the mother of the protagonist Líli portrayed by Juliana Paiva. In 2016, she played the main antagonist Sandra in Êta Mundo Bom!.

Filmography

Television

Film

Awards and nominations

References

External links

 
 

1974 births
Living people
People from Rio de Janeiro (state)
Brazilian people of Portuguese descent
Brazilian telenovela actresses
Brazilian film actresses
Citizens of Portugal through descent
20th-century Brazilian actresses
21st-century Brazilian actresses